Kelsey Atangamuerimo Harrison is an emeritus professor of obstetrics and gynaecology and former vice-chancellor of University of Port Harcourt, who contributed immensely to studies of maternal health, especially during pregnancy. As a researcher at the University of Ibadan, he mapped out the effects of severe anaemia on the mother and her baby, and established the safety of treating gross anaemia by packed cell transfusion combined with rapidly acting diuretic. He was also part of a group that discovered the dangerous threat posed by sickle cell disease to maternal and fetal lives among Africans. In Zaria, the results of the work of a team he led, became the most powerful boost to international advocacy for better maternal and perinatal health in developing countries. Now retired, his life is summed up thus - an obstetrician and gynaecologist, a teacher and trainer, medical academic, university administrator, a sort of social activist, and a cricket and music fan.

Life
Professor Kelsey Atangamuerimo Harrison was born in Abonnema, Rivers State, on 9 January 1933. He received his primary school education locally at Bishop Crowther Memorial School. After an outstanding secondary school career at Government College Umuahia, he trained at University College Ibadan and at University College Hospital London, graduating MB BS with honours and distinction in Obstetrics and Gynaecology in 1958.

Towards specializing in Obstetrics and Gynaecology, he received his postgraduate research and clinical training in Nigeria and United Kingdom (UK), most notably under John Lawson in Ibadan, W.C.W Nixon in London, and F. E. Hytten in various U K Medical Research Council units. He became a member in 1964, and a fellow in 1973, of the Royal College of Obstetricians and Gynaecologists in London. Already a foundation member of the Society of Gynaecology and Obstetrics of Nigeria in 1965, he was professor of obstetrics and gynaecology, first in Ibadan in 1972, then in Zaria from 1972 to 1981, and lastly in Port Harcourt, 1981–1998, where he became that university's Vice-Chancellor from 1989–1992, having earlier been the Dean of the Faculty of Medicine of Ahmadu Bello University Zaria. He retired from the Nigerian university system in 1998, and was appointed in July 1999, an emeritus professor of obstetrics and gynaecology at the University of Port Harcourt.

He is a recognised authority on anaemia, sickle cell disease and malaria in pregnancy. His researches on anaemia at Ibadan University led to the development of the solution to the serious life-threatening problem of extreme anaemia in late pregnancy. Another group to which he belonged, unraveled the influence of several haemoglobinopathies on pregnant women and their babies under African conditions, and how best to deal with the most dangerous of them, namely sickle cell disease. In Zaria, his collaborative studies on malaria in pregnancy discovered that protecting early teenage pregnant girls against malaria and anaemia conferred a hitherto unknown benefit: the protected girls grew taller, they produced bigger babies, yet the proportion of those of them who developed cephalopelvic disproportion and needed operative delivery, fell sharply. This offers hope that in malaria endemic areas, obstructed labour and vesicovaginal fistula (VVF) might be prevented by protecting these vulnerable girls against malaria and by adding nutritional supplements to their diets during pregnancy.

The Zaria Maternity Survey by a team Harrison led, was his most influential work. Between 1976 and 1979, Harrison and his colleagues collected data on over 22,000 births that when analysed, threw open the problems of traditional forms of interference, of adolescent marriage and pregnancy, of women's inferior status, and of their neglect in pregnancy, labour and afterwards, and of the consequences of this neglect especially high levels of both maternal mortality and VVF. The strongest message that came through this work was that both maternal and perinatal health benefitted hugely when women were educated, but not when they were illiterate. Harrison concluded that although the real priority in the area is reducing maternal deaths, the real problem to be faced is not so much medical but sociological, and that the eradication of mass illiteracy through universal formal education is a fundamental key to better maternal health. In other words, if we want to reduce maternal mortality we should stop looking at the problem in isolation. Harrison's work was published by British Journal of Obstetrics and Gynaecology in October 1985.,. The work gained instant recognition as a major advance in maternity care, and featured as a major factor in the planning and launching of the international safe motherhood movement in 1987. <ref. www.amazon.com/Arduous-Climb-Obstetrician-University-Vice-Chancellor/product-reviews/1905068395/ref...>/ref>
Back in Zaria, the activities of the team Kelsey Harrison led, that included sociologists succeeded in eradicating VVF in the Zaria area in the 1970s, although it resurged after he had left the area.

Besides Harrison's heavy clinical, teaching and research activities, he took active part in various community services and international assignments throughout his working life and afterwards. In the 1970s, it was the rehabilitation of sections of the health care services of the Rivers state of Nigeria, destroyed through military operations in the country's civil war. As part of the post civil war rehabilitation effort, he helped to ensure that displaced students of Eastern Nigeria origin were reabsorbed back to their former places in university of Ibadan. In the same decade, he was a member of the medical research council of Nigeria. In the 1980s, he took part in various WHO technical working groups on anaemia, maternal mortality and VVF. In the 1990s, he influenced the formation of the National Foundation of VVF - a local NGO - becoming its president in 1997-1998. Its activities placed the surgical treatment of VVF in Nigeria's national agenda The WHO and other powerful international organisations and many NGOs have since taken over the concept and extended it to other African and some Asian countries.

Kelsey Harrison published widely. Among them are 4 books and more than 100 medical journal articles. The two most widely known are the report on the Zaria Maternity Survey and his autobiography. His latest work titled Open these gates was published this year.

Awards and recognition

Kelsey Harrison became a College Scholar of University College Ibadan in 1952 - 1955. He earned the Doctor of Medicine degree of University of London in 1969 with a thesis on Blood Volume in Severe Anaemia in Pregnancy.

In 1987, he received the triennial George Macdonald Medal awarded jointly by the Royal Society of Tropical Medicine and Hygiene and the London School of Hygiene and Tropical Medicine. It was "for outstanding research leading to improvement of health in tropical countries". In 1988, he was awarded the higher doctorate degree – Doctor of Science (Medicine) London - for his distinguished work and publications on the theme of "childbearing under adverse socioeconomic conditions with special reference to Black Africa". The Nigerian National Order of Merit came in 1989." He is a Fellow of the Academy of Science of Nigeria since 1988. For ten years, 1991 – 2001, he was a Foundation Member of the International Advisory Board of The Lancet medical journal. Among his prestigious public lectures are the William Meredith Fletcher Shaw Memorial Lecture for the year 1995 at the Royal College of Obstetricians and Gynaecologists in London and titled "Poverty, deprivation and maternal health"., and the 7th Professor Olikoye Ransome Kuti Memorial Lecture titled "Reducing Maternal Mortality in Nigeria: Looking Back and Looking Forward”. delivered in Lagos in June 2012. In the latter, he outlined significant events in the struggle against maternal mortality and VVF in Nigeria. In 2009,the Government of Rivers State of Nigeria named its newest hospital in Port Harcourt, after him. Most recently in February 2014, he was awarded the Nigerian Centenary Honours award by the President of Nigeria, Dr. Goodluck Ebele Jonathan.
April 2022: 
Royal College Of Obstetricians and Gynaecologists London Distinguished Service Medal for "outstanding services to obstetrics and gynaecology.''

Personal interests
On retirement from the Nigerian university system in 1998, he moved to Finland where he lives with his wife, Irma Seppanen, herself a retired public health chief matron. His son, his daughter, and two young adult granddaughters, live in United Kingdom.
Good at games, drama and music (piano) at college Kelsey Harrison also led the college choir. He regularly played cricket to a high standard in Ibadan and London and subsequently for Nigeria in the 1950s and 60s as opening batsman and wicket keeper. His current interests include gardening, music appreciation, and reading.

See also
Kelsey Harrison Hospital
•Government College Umuahia

References

1.Harrison. K. A. (1982) "Anaemia, malaria and sickle cell disease". Clinics in Obstetrics and Gynaecology 9. 445-447.
2. Harrison K. A. Fleming A. F. Briggs N. D. Rossiter C. E.(1985) "Growth during pregnancy in Nigerian teenage primigravidae." Harrison K. A. editor. "Childbearing, Health and Social Priorities: a survey of 22774 consecutive hospital births in Zaria Northern Nigeria". British Journal of Obstetrics and Gynaecology 92 Supplement 5. pages 32–39.
3.Editorial  (1987) "Maternal Health in Sib-Saharan Africa". Lancet 329 pages 255-257.
4.Harrison K. A. (1985) "Childbearing, Health and Social Priorities - a survey of 22774 consecutive hospital births in Northern Nigeria". British Journal Of Obstetrics and Gynaecology 92 Supplement 5 pages 1–119
5.Aficionado. An Arduous climb to an excellent vantage point.10 March 2015.www.amazon.com/Arduous-Climb-Obstetrician-University-Vice-Chance3llor/product-reviews/19050683957ref...
6.Murphy M and Baba Turku M(1981)"Rural dwellers and health care in Northern Nigeria. Social Science and Medicine" 15A pages 265-271.
7.Harrison K. A (1980)"Traditional Birth Attendants" Lancet 316 pages 43–44
8.Nigeria Campaign to end fistula www.endfistula.org
9.International Day to End Fistula 23 May http://www.un.org/en/events/endfistuladay/
10.Harrison K. A. (2006) "An Arduous Climb from the Creeks of the Niger Delta to a Leading Obstetrician and University Vice Chancellor". Adonis and Abbey Ltd London 2006.
11.Harrison Kelsey (2018) Open These Gates. Publisher LAP Lambert Academic Publishing. Mauritius.
12. Federal Government of Nigeria. "Nigerian National Order of Merit" (https://web.archive.org7//20131102183440/http//www.nnma.gov,ng/NNMA.Awardees.html)on 2 November 2013
Retrieved 22 March 2014
13.Harrison K. A. (1996)"Poverty, Deprivation and Maternal Health" in Studd J W. W. editor."The YearBook of the Royal College of Obstetricians and Gynaecologists 1966" C. P. C. Press pages 33–44
14.http://wharc-online.org/wp/wp-content/unloads/2012/09/Preventing-maternal-deaths-in-Nigeria-looking-back-and-looking-forward.pdf
15.Distinguished Academics 55 Professor Kelsey Harrison
(http://nigericentenary.com.ng/home/index.php/media-center/131-nigerian-centenary-honors-award-5)
Archived
(hpps:web.archive.org/web/20140322213452/http://nigeriacentenary.com.ng/home/index.php/media-center/131-nigerian-centenary-honors-award-5)22 March 2014 at the Wayback Machine. Secretary. Presidential Committee on Nigeria's Centenary Celebrations.

1933 births
University of Ibadan alumni
Alumni of the University of London
Academic staff of the University of Ibadan
Living people
Educators from Rivers State
Academic staff of the University of Port Harcourt
People from Abonnema
Nigerian obstetricians
Nigerian gynaecologists
Nigerian expatriates in Finland
Government College Umuahia alumni